Marcela Kalistová (born 17 February 1970, in Bardejov) is a Slovak former basketball player who competed in the 2000 Summer Olympics.

References

1970 births
Living people
Slovak women's basketball players
Czechoslovak women's basketball players
Olympic basketball players of Slovakia
Basketball players at the 2000 Summer Olympics
People from Bardejov
Sportspeople from the Prešov Region